Wu-Tang Chamber Music is a compilation album endorsed by Wu-Tang Clan, which was released through E1 Music/Universal Records on June 30, 2009. The album features performances by several Wu-Tang members (GZA, Masta Killa, Method Man & Cappadonna are absent) and affiliates.  The album was released to positive reviews from music critics. This album was followed up with the 2011 compilation album Legendary Weapons.

Compilation background
Although it is not actually a group album, RZA is the executive producer for the album, and it features several members of the Wu-Tang Clan collaborating with New York hip hop veterans; AZ, Kool G Rap, M.O.P., Sadat X, Sean Price, Cormega, Masta Ace, and Havoc of Mobb Deep. The album also includes several philosophical spoken word tracks from the RZA.

The album's production features live instrumentation by Brooklyn soul band, The Revelations, directed, edited, and produced by The Revelations, Bob Perry, Andrew Kelley, Noah Rubin, M.O.P.'s Lil' Fame (also known as Fizzy Womack), Josh Werner, and Gintas Janusonis. Chamber Music has a sound inspired by classic soul and kung fu imagery that resembles the signature Wu-Tang Clan sound. In regards to this RZA mentioned:

Track listing

References

External links

Wu-Tang Clan albums
Albums produced by RZA
Hip hop compilation albums
2009 compilation albums
E1 Music compilation albums
Universal Records compilation albums
Collaborative albums